The women's shot put event at the 2009 Summer Universiade was held on 11 July.

Results

References
Results (archived)

Shot
2009 in women's athletics
2009